Jean-Paul Mendy (born 15 August 1982), is a French professional footballer who plays for Oissel as a midfielder.

Professional career
Mendy spent most of his career in the lower divisions of France, but briefly played professional football with US Orléans in the Ligue 2. He made his professional debut in a 2–0 loss to Valenciennes FC on 26 September 2014.

International career
Born in France and of Bissau-Guinean descent, Mendy was called up to the Guinea Bissau national football team for the 2017 Africa Cup of Nations, but failed to make the final team.

References

External links
 USOFoot Profile
 
 
 

Living people
1982 births
Sportspeople from Évreux
Association football defenders
French footballers
Bissau-Guinean footballers
French people of Bissau-Guinean descent
Citizens of Guinea-Bissau through descent
FC Rouen players
US Orléans players
US Quevilly-Rouen Métropole players
CMS Oissel players
Championnat National players
Ligue 2 players
Footballers from Normandy